Thiohalospira halophila  is a halophilic, obligately chemolithoautotrophic and sulfur-oxidizing bacterium from the genus of Thiohalospira which has been isolated from a hypersaline lake from Siberia.

References 

Chromatiales
Bacteria described in 2008
Halophiles